Giorgio Panariello (born 30 September 1960 in Florence) is an Italian comedian, film and stage actor, director and television presenter.

Biography
Born in Florence to a father of Campanian origin, he raised in Cinquale, a seaside town in the province of Massa-Carrara. During his high school years in Marina di Massa he became close friend with Carlo Conti, disc jockey and local TV presenter, with whom he started his early career as comedian in Versilia. His very first sketches included a parody of singer Renato Zero, a role which gave him popularity and made him debut in RAI television with his friend Conti in the early 1990s.

In 1996 he debuted as film actor in Albergo Roma, directed by Ugo Chiti. In 1999 he directed his first feature, Bagnomaria, a sketch comedy film centered on the characters of his popular stage shows. The film was panned by critics, but was a commercial success and its increasing popularity gained it a cult movie status. His second film At the Right Moment (2000) was instead panned both by critics and audience and failed at the box-office.

He appeared since then in a number of Italian comedy films such as Leonardo Pieraccioni's I Love You in Every Language in the World (2005), Fausto Brizzi's Notte prima degli esami – Oggi (2007) and Vincenzo Salemme's SMS - Sotto mentite spoglie (2007) and No problem (2008).

In 2006 he hosted the 56th Sanremo Music Festival.

His characters
Mario the lifeguard
Simone the kid
Merigo the drunk
PR of Kitikaka Disco of Orbetello
Lello Splendor
Signora Italia
Naomo

Filmography

Director
Bagnomaria (1999)
At the Right Moment (2000)

Actor
Cannibali (1995)
Albergo Roma (1996)
Finalmente soli (1997)
Bagnomaria (1999)
At the Right Moment (2000)
Chi? (2001)
I Love You in Every Language in the World (2005)
Notte prima degli esami – Oggi (2007)
SMS - Sotto mentite spoglie (2007)
No problem (2008)
I mostri oggi (2009)
Sharm el Sheikh - Un'estate indimenticabile (2010)
Natale in Sudafrica (2010)
Amici miei – Come tutto ebbe inizio (2011)
Un fantastico via vai (2013)
...e fuori nevica! (2014)
Uno per tutti (2015)

Notes

External links

 
 Giorgio Panariello - Official Site

1960 births
Living people
Italian male comedians
People from Massa